N. A. Semashko City Hospital No. 1 is a large hospital in Rostov-on-Don.

History 
Central Hospital № 1 of the city of Rostov-on-Don traces its history back in June 1922, when the Don District Hospital was opened in the city. The new hospital was opened on the site of the infectious barracks of the military evacuation hospital, where epidemics of cholera, typhus, dysentery and other diseases of this type were treated. The chief physician of the new hospital was Dr. E. B Libenzon, relative of a Russian American lawyer Ilya Libenzon. In September 1922, the  moved to the hospital after the medical faculty of the University of Warsaw moved into its former premises. At end of 1922, another surgical department under the leadership of Leon Solomonovich Astvatsaturov started operating. The children's department of Nikolaev hospital took over one of the repaired barracks and provided 30-40 beds. A nursery for the hospital staff was organised in the same building. The therapeutical department under the leadership of P. I. Perfiliev was designed for 70 beds.

The hospital equipment was the basis of the new hospital's three-room laboratory; the head of the laboratory was Dr. M. I. Shyschal, the first prosector was D.V. Khovansky, who was soon replaced by Professor , who developed the hospital's pro-sectoral service. Krinitsky became the organizer of the clinical-anatomical conferences and, as pointed out by local historian Minas Bagdykov, founded a new pathoanatomical school.

In 1923, an infectious disease department was established in the hospital. It was designed to solve the problems of fighting typhus, cholera and malaria. The future academician  became its first head. In the next two years, two more infectious departments were created, later the total number of beds in all three departments reached 300. The children's infectious disease department was designed for 120 patients with scarlet fever. It was headed by Dr. M. E Lansberg. In 1925 a ward for those sick with measles opened, followed by ones for chicken pox and diphtheria in 1926.

Between 1926 and 1930 the hospital was reconstructed to the design of Moscow architects Golosov,  and Ilyin. The new hospital had 2,100 beds, its chief doctor was Dr. S. L. Klyachkin.

Since 1931, the hospital had a separate children's hospital with 120 beds, headed by Dr. E. M Grinberg. Later the children's departments of the hospital were used by the Department of Children's Diseases of Rostov University under the direction of Professor . In 1931 an otolaryngological department was opened. The medical institute immediately began operating under its director, D. I. Zimont was the director until 1953, later he was replaced by the head of the ENT department , who created his own school).

After the restoration of the right wing of the hospital, which had been damaged during the Great Patriotic War, the eye clinic moved into it. The Oncology Center is also housed in the hospital complex .

Object of cultural heritage 

The facades of the hospital are made of facing silicate bricks, the architecture is functional: the shape of the windows indicate the purpose of the rooms behind them.

When the hospital administration decided to construct a new 12-storey building and to demolish the old buildings, an inquiry was instituted. A compromise solution allowed the combination of the construction of a new building with the preservation of architecturally significant features. But in 2012 the conflict flared up again. The hospital management appealed directly to the governor of Rostov Oblast Vasiliy Golubev.

In early 2013, the administration of Rostov Oblast recognized the complex of hospital buildings as an object of cultural heritage of regional significance. In December 2013, the governor authorized the reconstruction of the complex, which will be completed by October 2014.

See also
Nikolai Semashko (medicine), the hospital's namesake

References

External links 
 

Tourist attractions in Rostov-on-Don
Hospitals in Russia
Buildings and structures in Rostov-on-Don
Cultural heritage monuments in Rostov-on-Don
Hospitals built in the Soviet Union
Hospitals established in 1922
Cultural heritage monuments of regional significance in Rostov Oblast